Henrik Stubkjær (born 31 of December 1961 in Brædstrup) is a Danish Lutheran theologian and since November 2014 the 44th Bishop of Viborg in the Evangelical Lutheran Church in Denmark.

Life
Stubkjær graduated in theology from Aarhus University in 1990. Between 1993-96 he was vicar of Møllevang Church in Aarhus and a chaplain to the students at Aarhus University. From 1996 to 2005 he was the head of the Deaconal Collage in Aarhus (Diakonhøjskolen in Aarhus) – an educational centre for diaconia. From 2005 to 2014 he served as Secretary General in DanChurchAid – a humanitarian NGO rooted in the Evangelical Lutheran Church in Denmark and also a member organization of the Act Allicance. He has been a Board member of the ACT Alliance, and Chair in ACT EU.

In 2014 he was elected bishop of Viborg. As a bishop he has been very engaged in missional, diaconal and ecumenical work. Through a diocesan committee, study trips to meet churches in other countries are arranged on a regular basis, and he emphasized building relations with Orthodox migrants of Eastern European background, Farsi speaking migrants, and asylum seekers.

Furthermore, Stubkjær has placed great emphasis on theological education for lay people in the diocese, based on Luther’s concept of the priesthood of all believers.

Henrik Stubkjær has been engaged in ecumenical work for many years. As a bishop he has developed strong relations to other churches – in Denmark and abroad. For example, there are strong ties and mutual exchange and learning between the diocese of Viborg and the Lutheran Church of Christ in Nigeria as well as Diocese of Guildford in Church in England.  Furthermore, Stubkjær served as chair of the National Council of Churches in Denmark for one term (2016-2019). Since 2017 he has served as a member of the Council in The Lutheran World Federation as well Chair of World Service. In the summer 2020 he completed a Master of Public Governance (MPG) from Copenhagen Business School.

References

1961 births
Living people
21st-century Lutheran bishops
Danish Lutheran bishops
People from Horsens Municipality